Yi Jia (2nd-century BC), was a Chinese physician.  She is known as one of the famous four female physicians in Chinese history, along with Zhang Xiaoniang of Northern Song dynasty, Gu Bao of the Jin dynasty and Tan Yunxian, who was active during the Ming dynasty.    She was active during the reign of Emperor Wu of Han.

References 

2nd-century BC births
2nd-century BC deaths
2nd-century BC Chinese women
2nd-century BC Chinese people
Ancient women physicians